On July 18 – 19 2006, in 32 hours and 18 minutes, Jenna Lambert, then aged 15, became the first female with a physical disability to swim across Lake Ontario. She entered Lake Ontario in Baird Point, New York, and swam 34 kilometres to Lake Ontario Park, in Kingston, Ontario.

Biography
Jenna lives in Harrowsmith, Ontario, with her parents Ron and Christine Lambert, and her sister Natalie Lambert, who also is a marathon swimmer, on a hobby farm.

The swim, which was predicted to take 24 hours, was extended when Jenna faced strong winds, and waves that pushed directly against her for the majority of the swim. She accomplished this feat despite not being able to use her legs due to cerebral palsy. She did it to raise money to build a new swimming pool for disabled persons in her native Kingston, Ontario.

Jenna Lambert also won Athlete of the year in 2007. In 2009, Jenna also completed a one-woman ultra-triathlon in an effort to raise further awareness for the Y Knot Abilities Programs. This was a 270 km journey which took her from Belleville to Ottawa in 48 hours and 17 mins. Divided into three parts, the adventure was 1 part swim (30 km) 1 part hand-cycle (230 km) and 1 part wheel in a manual wheelchair (10 km).

Jenna is now focusing on her competitive aspirations and is swimming as a part of Team Canada. Jenna attends Wilfrid Laurier University and hopes to make the Paralympic team, traveling to London in 2012.

External links
Jenna Lambert's Kid 4 Kids Marathon

References

People from Frontenac County
Canadian female long-distance swimmers
Living people
Year of birth missing (living people)
21st-century Canadian women